There was no defending champion as the 2016 edition was abandoned due to the 2016 Turkish coup d'état attempt.

Valentyna Ivakhnenko and Anastasiya Vasylyeva won the title, defeating Dea Herdželaš and Aleksandra Pospelova in the final, 6–3, 5–7, [10–1].

Seeds

Draw

References
Main Draw

Bursa Cup - Doubles
Bursa Cup